Made in Sweden was a Swedish jazz-rock supergroup active from 1968 to 1977.

The founding members were Georg Wadenius (guitar), Bo Häggström (bass, piano and organ), and Tommy "Slim" Borgudd (drums) previously members of the pioneering Swedish rock group Lea Riders Group, which broke up in mid-1968.

Their first album, Made in Sweden (with Love) (1968), was a hit in Sweden and was nominated for a Grammy. They won the Swedish Grammis for Best Band in 1969 and 1970. The band was closely associated with the Stockholm music venue "Gyllene Cirkeln" and recorded a live album (Live! At the Golden Circle) there in 1970.

Singer Tommy Körberg joined the band in 1976, appearing on their last album Where Do We Begin (1976). At that point the Polish keyboard player Wlodek Gulgowski joined the band, as well as two Finns, bassist Pekka Pohjola and drummer Vesa Aaltonen, who had gained earlier reputation with Wigwam and Tasavallan Presidentti respectively.

Discography 

 1968: Made in Sweden (with Love)
 1969: Snakes in a Hole
 1970: Live! At the Golden Circle
 1970: Made in England
 1970: Regnbågslandet
 1971: Best of
 1976: Where Do We Begin

References

External links 
 Swedish Grammis Official Web site
 Made in Sweden discography and album reviews, credits & releases at AllMusic
 Made in Sweden discography, album releases & credits at Discogs.com
 Made in Sweden biography, discography, album credits & user reviews at ProgArchives.com
 Made in Sweden albums to be listened as stream at Spotify.com

Swedish musical groups
Musical groups established in 1968
Musical groups disestablished in 1977